Stealing the Wave: The Epic Struggle Between Ken Bradshaw and Mark Foo is a book written by Andy Martin and published by Bloomsbury Publishing in 2007.  It tells the story of surfers Mark Foo and Ken Bradshaw battling for supremacy at Waimea Bay, on the North Shore of Hawaii, where some of the biggest waves in the world crash onto the shore.

Reviews
The Guardian
The Scotsman
The Times

Stealing the Wave
Bloomsbury Publishing books